The first cycle of Britain's Next Top Model premiered on 14 September 2005 on Living TV. Model Lisa Butcher served as the show's first host, with a panel consisting of former fashion model Marie Helvin and photographer Jonathan Phang.

The prizes for this cycle included a modelling contract with Models 1, as well as an additional contract with Beatrice Models in Milan, a cover feature for B magazine, and a contract with Ruby & Millie cosmetics.

The winner of the competition was 20-year-old Lucy Ratcliffe from Newcastle upon Tyne.

Cast

Contestants
(Ages stated are at start of contest)

Judges
 Lisa Butcher (host)
 Marie Helvin
Jonathan Phang

Results

 The contestant won the competition
 The contestant was eliminated
 The contestant was part of a non-elimination bottom two
 The contestant quit the competition

 Episode 8 was the recap episode.

Bottom two

 The contestant was eliminated after her first time in the bottom two
 The contestant was eliminated after her second time in the bottom two
 The contestant was eliminated after her third time in the bottom two
 The contestant quit the competition
 The contestant was eliminated in the final judging and placed as the runner-up

Average  call-out order
Final two is not included.

Ratings
Episode Viewing figures from BARB

Notes

References

External links
 Britain's Next Top Model at LivingTV
 

01
2005 British television seasons
Television shows filmed in England
Television shows filmed in Italy